Aphrophora cribrata, the pine spittlebug, is a species of spittlebug in the family Aphrophoridae.

References

External links

 

Articles created by Qbugbot
Insects described in 1851
Aphrophoridae